Karl Wallenborg (12 May 1875 – 16 January 1962) was a Swedish sports shooter. He competed in two events at the 1912 Summer Olympics.

References

External links
 

1875 births
1962 deaths
Swedish male sport shooters
Olympic shooters of Sweden
Shooters at the 1912 Summer Olympics
Sportspeople from Södermanland County
20th-century Swedish people